Henri Treial (born 28 May 1992) is an Estonian volleyball player, a member of the Estonia men's national volleyball team and Belgian club Greenyard Maaseik.

Club career
Treial was born in Võru, and started his career in hometown club Valio Võru at the age of 16. After four seasons he moved to Bigbank Tartu and won the Estonian Championship in 2014 and the Baltic League title in 2015. He then moved to abroad and signed with Czech team ČEZ Karlovarsko. With the team he won the Czech Championship in 2018. Treial spent the 2018–19 season in Italy playing for VBC Mondovì alongside compatriot Kristo Kollo. Treial spent the next season in native Estonia and played for Saaremaa. He spent the 2020–21 season in France playing for Saint-Nazaire Volley-Ball and then signed with Belgian top team Greenyard Maaseik.

Estonian national team
As a member of the senior Estonia men's national volleyball team, Treial competed at the 2015 Men's European Volleyball League, finishing in 4th place and at the 2015 Men's European Volleyball Championship, finishing in 11th place. He also represented his country at the 2017 Men's European Volleyball Championship.

Sporting achievements

Clubs
Baltic League
  2013/2014 – with Bigbank Tartu
  2014/2015 – with Bigbank Tartu

National championship
 2013/2014  Estonian Championship, with Bigbank Tartu
 2014/2015  Estonian Championship, with Bigbank Tartu
 2017/2018  Czech Championship, with ČEZ Karlovarsko

National cup
 2013/2014  Estonian Cup 2013, with Bigbank Tartu
 2016/2017  Czech Cup 2017, with ČEZ Karlovarsko
 2017/2018  Czech Cup 2018, with ČEZ Karlovarsko
 2019/2020  Estonian Cup 2019, with Saaremaa

National team
 2018  Challenger Cup

Individual
 2015 Baltic League – Best Blocker

References

1992 births
Living people
Estonian men's volleyball players
Estonian expatriate sportspeople in the Czech Republic
Expatriate volleyball players in the Czech Republic
Estonian expatriate sportspeople in Italy
Expatriate volleyball players in Italy
Sportspeople from Võru
Estonian expatriate volleyball players
Estonian expatriate sportspeople in France
Expatriate volleyball players in France
Estonian expatriate sportspeople in Belgium
Expatriate volleyball players in Belgium